Terminiello v. City of Chicago, 337 U.S. 1 (1949), was a case in which the Supreme Court of the United States held that a "breach of peace" ordinance of the City of Chicago that banned speech that "stirs the public to anger, invites dispute, brings about a condition of unrest, or creates a disturbance" was unconstitutional under the First and Fourteenth Amendments to the United States Constitution.

Background
Arthur Terminiello, a Catholic priest under suspension, gave a speech to the Christian Veterans of America in which he criticized various racial groups and made a number of inflammatory comments. There were approximately 800 people present in the auditorium during the speech and a crowd of approximately 1,000 people outside, protesting the speech. The Chicago Police Department was present, but was unable to maintain order completely. 

Terminiello was later assessed a fine of $100 dollars for violation of Chicago's breach of peace ordinance, which he appealed. Both the Illinois Appellate Court and Illinois Supreme Court affirmed the conviction. The US Supreme Court granted certiorari.

Majority opinion
Justice William O. Douglas, writing for the majority, reversed Terminiello's conviction, holding that his speech was protected by the First Amendment (which was made applicable to the states by the Fourteenth Amendment), and that the ordinance, as construed by the Illinois courts, was unconstitutional. Douglas said that the purpose of free speech was to invite dispute even where it incites people to anger; in fact, the provocative and inflammatory content of speech could potentially be seen as positive. 

Although Douglas acknowledged that freedom of speech was not limitless and did not apply to "fighting words" (citing Chaplinsky v. New Hampshire), he held that such limitations were inapplicable in this case:

The vitality of civil and political institutions in our society depends on free discussion. As Chief Justice Hughes wrote in De Jonge v. Oregon, 299 U.S. 353, 365, 260, it is only through free debate and free exchange of ideas that government remains responsive to the will of the people and peaceful change is effected. The right to speak freely and to promote diversity of ideas and programs is therefore one of the chief distinctions that sets us apart from totalitarian regimes.

Accordingly a function of free speech under our system of government is to invite dispute. It may indeed best serve its high purpose when it induces a condition of unrest, creates dissatisfaction with conditions as they are, or even stirs people to anger. Speech is often provocative and challenging. It may strike at prejudices and preconceptions and have profound unsettling effects as it presses for acceptance of an idea. That is why freedom of speech, though not absolute, Chaplinsky v. New Hampshire, supra, 315 U.S. at pages 571-572, 62 S.Ct. at page 769, is nevertheless protected against censorship or punishment, unless shown likely to produce a clear and present danger of a serious substantive evil that rises far above public inconvenience, annoyance, or unrest. See Bridges v. California, 314 U.S. 252, 262, 193, 159 A.L.R. 1346; Craig v. Harney, 331 U.S. 367, 373, 1253. There is no room under our Constitution for a more restrictive view. For the alternative would lead to standardization of ideas either by legislatures, courts, or dominant political or community groups.

Dissenting opinions

Vinson's dissent
Chief Justice Fred M. Vinson dissented on the ground that the jury instruction that to which the majority of the Supreme Court objected had been affirmed by both appellate courts. He felt that the Illinois courts had construed the ordinance only as punishing fighting words and that petitioner's counsel had not previously objected to the instruction on constitutional grounds.

Frankfurter's dissent
Justice Felix Frankfurter largely echoed the sentiments of Chief Justice Vinson, feeling that the majority was going out of its way to reverse Terminiello's fine, when such an action went against the balance of power between the federal and state courts:

Freedom of speech undoubtedly means freedom to express views that challenge deep-seated, sacred beliefs and to utter sentiments that may provoke resentment. But those indulging in such stuff as that to which this proceeding gave rise are hardly so deserving as to lead this Court to single them out as beneficiaries of the first departure from the restrictions that bind this Court in reviewing judgments of State courts. Especially odd is it to bestow such favor not for the sake of life or liberty, but to save a small amount of property — $100, the amount of the fine imposed upon the petitioner in a proceeding which is civil, not criminal, under the laws of Illinois, and thus subject only to limited review.

Jackson's dissent

Justice Jackson's dissent was considerably longer and more elaborate than Vinson's or Frankfurter's. Jackson felt the majority was ignoring the very real concern of maintaining public order, and that the majority's generalized suspicion of any restriction of free speech was blinding them to the fact that a riot was at Terminiello's place of speaking. His basic argument was that although the First Amendment protects the expression of ideas, it does not protect them absolutely, in all circumstances, regardless of the danger it may create to the public at large. To underscore his point, Jackson reiterated the testimony given at trial by Terminiello, as well as excerpts from Terminiello's speech, in which he made anti-semitic remarks, inflammatory comments about various U.S. government officials, and statements praising fascist leaders, in order to demonstrate the chaotic and violent situation in which Terminiello was speaking.

Jackson framed Terminiello's speech and the violent fracas that surrounded it in the context of the global struggle between fascism and communism in the post-World War II world.  He feared that these two groups, dominated as they were by radicals and accustomed to using violent means to propagate their ideology, were a threat to legitimate democratic governments and that the court's decision would greatly reduce the power of local law enforcement authorities to keep such violence in check. In doing so, Jackson quoted from Mein Kampf, to date the only reference to the Hitler work in a Supreme Court opinion. Jackson also noted that without the help of the Chicago Police Department, Terminiello would not have even been able to give his speech and that the majority's opinion was not in line with the "clear and present danger" test set forth in Schenck v. United States.

Jackson's dissent in this case is most famous for its final paragraph:

This Court has gone far toward accepting the doctrine that civil liberty means the removal of all restraints from these crowds and that all local attempts to maintain order are impairments of the liberty of the citizen. The choice is not between order and liberty. It is between liberty with order and anarchy without either. There is danger that, if the Court does not temper its doctrinaire logic with a little practical wisdom, it will convert the constitutional Bill of Rights into a suicide pact.

See also 
Clear and present danger
Imminent lawless action
List of United States Supreme Court cases, volume 337
Shouting fire in a crowded theater
Threatening the president of the United States
Abrams v. United States, 
Brandenburg v. Ohio, 
Chaplinsky v. New Hampshire, 
Dennis v. United States, 
Feiner v. New York, 
Hess v. Indiana, 
Korematsu v. United States, 
Kunz v. New York, 
Masses Publishing Co. v. Patten, (1917)
Sacher v. United States,  
Schenck v. United States, 
Terminiello v. Chicago, 
Whitney v. California, 
Yates v._United_States,

References

External links 

1949 in United States case law
United States Supreme Court cases
United States Free Speech Clause case law
History of Chicago
United States Supreme Court cases of the Vinson Court
1949 in Illinois